The 3rd Canadian Comedy Awards, presented by the Canadian Comedy Foundation for Excellence (CCFE), honoured the best live, television, and film comedy of 2001 and was held on 4 April 2002 at The Docks in Toronto, Ontario.  The ceremony was hosted by Brent Butt.  This was the first year that the ceremony was not televised, and the first year that no special awards were given.

Canadian Comedy Awards, also known as Beavers, were awarded in 19 categories. Winners were picked by members of ACTRA (Alliance of Canadian Cinema, Television and Radio Artists), the Writers Guild of Canada, the Directors Guild of Canada, and the Comedy Association.

The TV series Made in Canada led with eight nominations followed by the film Last Wedding with five.  Made in Canada won four Beavers, two of which went to director Henry Sarwer-Foner.  Also winning two Beavers were Janet van de Graaf for best female improviser and best female TV performance in History Bites, Bob Martin for best male improviser and best writing for an episode of Made in Canada, and Rick Mercer for best male TV performance in Made in Canada and writing for This Hour has 22 Minutes.

Ceremony

The 3rd Canadian Comedy Awards ceremony was held on 4 April 2002 at The Docks in Toronto, Ontario. It was hosted by Brent Butt, the previous year's winner for best male stand-up.  This was the first year the ceremony was not broadcast, due to a lack of sponsorship.  As a result, the ceremony was scaled back in what journalist Leatrice Spevack described as a night of "gags over glamour".

While giving his acceptance speech for best comedic play, the base of Doug Morency's Beaver fell off.  He quickly remarked, "Obviously, they're not made in Canada".

Winners and nominees
Winners are listed first and highlighted in boldface:

Live

Television

Film

Multiple wins
The following people, shows, films, etc. received multiple awards

Multiple nominations
The following people, shows, films, etc. received multiple nominations

References

External links
Canadian Comedy Awards official website

Canadian Comedy Awards
Canadian Comedy Awards
Awards
Awards
2001 awards in Canada